Brian Roy Cox (born 7 May 1961) is an English former professional footballer born in Sheffield, who played as a goalkeeper in the Football League for Sheffield Wednesday, Huddersfield Town, Mansfield Town and Hartlepool United.

Cox started his career as an apprentice at Sheffield Wednesday, making his debut as a 17-year-old in a 1–1 draw against Oxford United in the Football League Third Division. After making 26 appearances in all competitions, he left for Huddersfield Town. Cox helped Mick Buxton's side gain promotion to the Football League Second Division, though by the time he left after 213 league games they had returned to the Third, but he may be best remembered for a game against Manchester City in 1987 when three players, Paul Stewart, David White and Tony Adcock, all scored hat-tricks as Huddersfield lost 10–1. He went on to play for Mansfield Town and Hartlepool United, where he was part of the team that won promotion from the Fourth Division in the 1990–91 season. He later played for Buxton.

Brian Cox has since run betting shops and worked for an offshoot of the National Health Service. Cox is still living in his native Sheffield.

References

External links
 

1961 births
Living people
Footballers from Sheffield
English footballers
Association football goalkeepers
Sheffield Wednesday F.C. players
Huddersfield Town A.F.C. players
Mansfield Town F.C. players
Hartlepool United F.C. players
English Football League players
Buxton F.C. players